The Robert E. Lee Monument was an outdoor bronze equestrian statue of Confederate general Robert E. Lee and his horse Traveller located in Charlottesville, Virginia's Market Street Park (formerly Emancipation Park, and before that Lee Park) in the Charlottesville and Albemarle County Courthouse Historic District. The statue was commissioned in 1917 and dedicated in 1924, and in 1997 was listed on the National Register of Historic Places. It was removed on July 10, 2021.

In February 2017, as part of the movement for the removal of Confederate monuments and memorials, the Charlottesville City Council voted 3–2 for the statue's removal, along with the Stonewall Jackson statue, and for the Lee Park to be renamed. The removal proposal generated controversy. A lawsuit was filed on March 20, 2017, and in May 2017 a temporary injunction against its removal was granted by a judge, citing a Virginia state law that blocked the removal. White supremacists organized the Unite the Right rally for August 2017 to protest the proposed removal that drew numerous far-right groups from across the United States; this rally in turn caused counterdemonstrations, which in turn caused serious clashes; the event took a deadly turn when a white supremacist rammed a car into a crowd of counterdemonstrators, killing one and wounding 35. On August 23, 2017, the council had the statue shrouded in black, which in February 2018 a judge ordered removed. In July 2019 a permanent injunction was granted and in July 2020 the state law was amended to remove the grounds for objection raised by the judge. The Virginia Supreme Court lifted the injunction in April 2021, holding that the state law thought to restrict the removal did not apply retroactively to statutes passed before its effect (the law was applied to Virginia cities in 1997, but the statue had been erected in 1924). However, rather than immediately remove the statute, the city opted to employ the new removal process authorized under the law's 2020 amendments, which entails public notice, a public hearing after thirty days, and thirty days to field offers for relocation of the statue. On July 9, 2021, the City Council announced that the Lee Monument would be removed the following day, and, on July 10, 2021, both the Lee and Stonewall Jackson statues were removed by the city.

History
In 1917, Paul Goodloe McIntire commissioned the statue from the artist Henry Shrady (1871–1922). It was the second of four works he commissioned from members of the National Sculpture Society. McIntire wanted a public setting for the statue, buying a city block of land and demolishing existing structures on it to create a formal landscaped square, later named Lee Park (currently Market Street Park), the first of four parks he would donate to Charlottesville.

Shrady was chronically ill at the time of the commission – he worked on it slowly and it was still unfinished on his death in 1922. Leo Lentelli (1879–1961) completed the sculpture in 1924, and it was dedicated on May 21 of that year. It was cast in the Roman Bronze Works of Brooklyn, New York. Comparison with a surviving model of the proposed statue by Shrady reveals Lentelli's version is less animated than that intended by Shrady. The oval granite pedestal was designed by the architect Walter Blair and on its side has the inscription "Robert Edward Lee" with the dates 1807 and 1870. The sculpture and pedestal combined are approximately 26 feet high, 12 feet long, and 8 feet wide at the bottom of the pedestal.

Attempts to remove the statue 

In March 2016, Charlottesville's Vice Mayor Wes Bellamy publicly called on city council to remove the Lee statue and rename Lee Park, saying that the statue's presence "disrespected" parts of the community, and that he had "spoken with several different people who have said they have refused to step foot (sic) in that park because of what that statue and the name of that park represents. And we can't have that in the city of Charlottesville." Local NAACP head Rick Turner supported removal, calling Lee a terrorist. Others accused the city council and Bellamy of disregarding Lee's historical significance; overlooking his importance to Virginia; sowing division; and trying to rewrite history. A petition to remove the statue was initiated, with wording saying the statue represented "hate" and was a "subliminal message of racism".

In April 2016, the city council appointed a special commission, named the Blue Ribbon Commission on Race, Monuments and Public Spaces, to recommend to city officials how to best handle issues surrounding statues of Stonewall Jackson (Thomas Jonathan Jackson) in Court Square and Lee in Lee Park, as well as other landmarks and monuments. Early in November 2016, the Blue Ribbon Commission voted 6–3 to let both statues remain in place. On November 28, 2016, it voted 7–2 to remove the Lee statue to McIntire Park in Charlottesville and 8–1 to keep the Jackson statue in place, delivering a final report with that recommendation to Charlottesville City Council in December.

On February 6, 2017, Charlottesville's five-member city council voted 3-2 to remove the Lee statue and, unanimously, to rename Lee Park.

Lawsuit
In response, a lawsuit was filed on March 20, 2017, by multiple plaintiffs, including the Monument Fund Inc, the Sons of Confederate Veterans, and descendants of the statue's donor and sculptor, to block the removal of the Lee and Jackson statues. The lawsuit sought a temporary injunction to halt the removal, arguing that Charlottesville City Council's decision violated a state law designed to protect veterans' monuments and memorials, in this case veterans of the American Civil War, and that the council had additionally violated the terms of McIntire's gift to Charlottesville of the statue and the land for Lee Park.

The city responded by asking that the temporary injunction be denied, arguing that the two statues were not Confederate monuments and therefore outside the law's protection.  The City also argued that the law did not apply to any monuments erected before it was amended to apply to cities in 1997 -- which argument ultimately prevailed.
  
In April 2017, the city council voted 3-2 (exactly along the lines of the February vote) that the statue be removed completely from Charlottesville and sold to whoever the council chooses.

On May 2, 2017, Judge Richard Moore issued a temporary injunction blocking the removal of the Lee statue for six months, in the public's interest, pending his final decision in the suit.

In October 2019 Judge  Moore ruled that local authorities in Charlottesville cannot remove the two Confederate statues because they were war memorials protected by state law, and issued a permanent injunction preventing their removal.  

On April 1, 2021, the Virginia Supreme Court overturned Judge Moore's decision and lifted the injunction.

Unite the Right rally 

On May 13, 2017, neo-Nazi Richard B. Spencer led a torch-lit rally in Lee Park in protest at the Charlottesville town council's decision to remove and sell the statue and chanted "you will not replace us" and "Russia is our friend". Some of the ralliers procured bamboo tiki torches for a second, nighttime rally and shouted slogans including "Jews will not replace us", but put out their torches and left as police officers began to arrive to disperse them.

Protesters to the rally itself gathered the following day and held a silent candlelight vigil that attracted over a hundred of the town's citizens, and the incumbent mayor of Charlottesville, Michael Signer. Signer, who opposed the statue's removal, condemned the initial rally the night before. The organizations dedicated to preserving the Robert E. Lee statue issued a statement denying any involvement in the rally. Despite some conflict, no arrests were made and no one was injured.

On July 8, 2017, the Ku Klux Klan held a rally in Charlottesville protesting the city's plan to remove the statue. The approximately 50 Klansmen were met by several hundred counter-protesters. The police used tear gas to disperse the crowd, and made 23 arrests.

On August 12, 2017, during the Unite the Right rally, clashes broke out between supporters of the statue, who marched under Confederate, American, and Revolutionary flags, and counter-protesters. During the rally, counter-protester Heather Heyer was killed and 19 injured by a car ramming attack.

City and public responses

On August 20, 2017, the city council unanimously voted to shroud both the Lee and Jackson statues in black. The council "also decided to direct the city manager to take an administrative step that would make it easier to eventually remove the Jackson statue." The statues were covered in black shrouds on August 23, 2017. On Tuesday, February 27, 2018 Charlottesville Circuit Court Judge Richard Moore ruled that the City of Charlottesville must remove the black tarps covering the statues, and the city complied removing the shrouds a day later.

Sometime overnight between Friday July 7 and Saturday July 8, 2017, the statue was vandalized by being daubed in red paint. It had been vandalized before; in June 2016, the pedestal was spray painted with the words "Black Lives Matter".

In 2018, the statue was placed on the Make It Right Project's list of ten Confederate monuments it most wanted to see removed.

In October 14, 2019, both statues were damaged by a chisel (the Jackson statue being damaged a second time, as it was prior in September). Charlottesville police stated that they were investigating the vandalism. On November 28, 2019, the statue was painted with graffiti, saying: "Impeach Trump" and "This is Racist".

Removal 
On the morning of July 10, 2021, the statue was removed from its plinth by the city. The mayor of Charlottesville, Nikuyah Walker, stated that "Taking down this statue is one small step closer to the goal of helping Charlottesville, Virginia, and America, grapple with the sin of being willing to destroy Black people for economic gain." The statue was taken away from the site on a flatbed truck. The city stated that statue would be put into storage and the stone base removed at a later date, and that the final disposition of the statue was yet to be decided.

See also
George Rogers Clark (sculpture)
Meriwether Lewis and William Clark (sculpture)
Thomas Jonathan Jackson (sculpture)
Removal of Confederate monuments and memorials

References

1924 establishments in Virginia
1924 sculptures
Art works that caused riots
Bronze sculptures in Virginia
Buildings and structures in Charlottesville, Virginia
Equestrian statues in Virginia
Individually listed contributing properties to historic districts on the National Register in Virginia
Monuments and memorials on the National Register of Historic Places in Virginia
Charlottesville, Virginia
National Register of Historic Places in Charlottesville, Virginia
Outdoor sculptures in Charlottesville, Virginia
Sculptures of men in Virginia
Confederate States of America monuments and memorials in Virginia
Removed Confederate States of America monuments and memorials
Vandalized works of art in Virginia
Charlottesville historic monument controversy
Statues removed in 2021
Monuments and memorials in Virginia removed during the George Floyd protests
History of Charlottesville, Virginia